Dissotidendron is a genus of flowering plants belonging to the family Melastomataceae.

Its native range is Cameroon to Tanzania and Southern Tropical Africa.

Species:

Dissotidendron apricum 
Dissotidendron arborescens 
Dissotidendron bussei 
Dissotidendron caloneurum 
Dissotidendron cordatum 
Dissotidendron dichaetantheroides 
Dissotidendron glandulicalyx 
Dissotidendron johnstonianum 
Dissotidendron lanatum 
Dissotidendron melleri 
Dissotidendron polyanthum

References

Melastomataceae
Melastomataceae genera